John Dana Lee (born February 17, 1953) is a former American football defensive end in the National Football League who played for the San Diego Chargers and New England Patriots. He played college football for the Nebraska Cornhuskers. He also played in the USFL for the Chicago Blitz and Arizona Wranglers.

References

1953 births
Living people
American football defensive ends
San Diego Chargers players
New England Patriots players
Chicago Blitz players
Arizona Wranglers players
Nebraska Cornhuskers football players